Energy balance may refer to:

 Earth's energy balance, the relationship between incoming solar radiation, outgoing radiation of all types, and global temperature change.
 Energy accounting, a system used within industry, where measuring and analyzing the energy consumption of different activities is done to improve energy efficiency
 Energy balance (biology), a measurement of the biological homeostasis of energy in living systems
 Energy balance (energy economics), verification and analysis of emergence, transformation and use of energy sources within an economic zone
 Energy economics, where the energy balance of a country is an aggregate presentation of all human activities related to energy, except for natural and biological processes
 Energy Economics (journal), a scientific journal published by Elsevier under its "North Holland" imprint
 Energy returned on energy invested (EROEI), ratio of the amount of usable energy acquired from a particular energy resource to the amount of energy expended to obtain that energy resource
 First law of thermodynamics, according to which energy cannot be created or destroyed, only modified in form
 Groundwater energy balance, comparing a groundwater body in terms of incoming hydraulic energy associated with groundwater inflow and  outflow

See also
 Balance energy, a closetorealtime ancillary service to balance power flows and managed by the incumbent transmission system operator or similar entity